This is a list of notable people affiliated with the École Polytechnique. Alumni of the École Polytechnique are traditionally referred to as "X", or "Xnnnn", where nnnn stands for the year of admission into the school.

Nobel laureates

Science, technology, and mathematics

Humanities, arts, and social sciences

Business

Politics and public service

Military

Aviators and astronauts

Religious leaders

References